The University of Montenegro Faculty of Fine Arts (Montenegrin: Fakultet Likovnih Umjetnosti Univerziteta Crne Gore Факултет Ликовних Умјетности Универзитета Црне Горе) is one of the educational institutions of the University of Montenegro. The Faculty is located in Cetinje, in the building of the former Russian embassy to Montenegro.

History 

Fine art education in Cetinje began with the establishment of the Secondary Art School in 1947. On May 18, 1988, the Faculty of Fine Arts was officially founded. The Faculty is located in the building of the former Russian Embassy which was designed by an Italian architect and is protected under the Historical Monuments Act.

Organization 

The Faculty of Fine Arts represents a modern artistic and educational institution that organizes work at academic undergraduate, specialist and master studies within the following study programs:
 Painting
 Sculpture
 Graphics
 Graphic Design

Center 42° 

The Art Exploration Center 42° of the Faculty of Fine Arts was established in 2010. Its aim is to promote contemporary art and its production. Within the Center, there's a library (encompassing the learning material of the Faculty of Fine Arts and the Faculty of Drama), a gallery and 2 apartments offering accommodation for the visiting professors.

References 

Fine Arts
Fine Arts
Montenegro
1988 establishments in Yugoslavia